Fate of the Norns is a series of Viking fantasy role-playing games first published in 1993 by Pendelhaven, created by Andrew Valkauskas. The game uses an experience point system and afterlife mechanics rooted deeply in Norse mythology.

Several different editions and supplements (mostly adventures) were published in digital form since then. Starting in mid-2012, print versions of a few core products became available, leading to renewed interest and new planned products.

Fate of the Norns: Ragnarok and the RGS

The most recent editions, starting with 2006's Fate of the Norns: Ragnarok, replace earlier editions' dice-based skill checks and combat mechanics with a new system based on Elder Futhark Runes for flavour, albeit in a very non-traditional way.  They are also somewhat more supernatural-oriented than previous editions, in part due to the change of premise from the conflicts between Aesir and Vanir to the unraveling of the Nordic end times, the Ragnarok. In both editions of Fate of the Norns: Ragnarok, characters must die in order to progress past a certain point, and the character sheets include information about their legacy from previous lives.

Game Summary
Legend has it that during every man’s birth, the three Norns come to discuss his destiny and time of death. When they decide that man’s fate, no mortal or deity may change the course of the future. It is said that even Ragnarok, the twilight of the Gods, was determined by the Norns.

History

Fate of the Norns, first edition (1993-2013)
The first edition of Fate of the Norns achieved viral internet distribution in the late 1990s via a free demo PDF. This PDF was a shorter version of the full game, with 80 pages as opposed to the full product's 320. The game brought about a variety of magic and occupations: 6 types of distinct magic (independent systems), and over 35 occupations. The timing system in the game was also unique in the industry,  assigning speed factors for every action, and staggering all actions based on those segment offsets.

This edition was published as a printed product in 2012 and retired in late 2013.

Fate of the Norns, second edition (2002)
The second edition of Fate of the Norns implemented an evolution of the game engine incorporating RPG industry trends. With the advent of MMORPGs and combat evolving into more than a roll-to-hit and roll-for-damage model, the game engine incorporated a myriad of special maneuvers, supplying players with a colourful repertoire of actions during combat. This eliminated the classic RPG combat grid. The character progression was changed from linear to distributed. Rather than using a linear skill tree, the character skills would evolve over several "chess boards" of skills and abilities.

It also emphasized the historical background and introduced the theme of the Aesir-Vanir war.

This edition has never been published as print product, and it's more difficult to find than the first edition (which was readily available to buy both in PDF and hardcover forms during much of 2012 and all of 2013).

Fate of the Norns: Ragnarok (2005-2006)
Fate of the Norns: Ragnarok was a new game in terms of setting and mechanics. No longer using dice, it introduced what is now known as the first version of the Runic Game System (RGS), using Elder Futhark runes instead of dice. The game takes place during the final war between the gods and the giants, allowing players to play supernatural beings such as Einherjar and Valkyries.

This edition has never been published in print form and may be difficult to find.

"The Twilight of the gods nears,
Brother will kill brother,
Families sundered by incest,
Four ages afoot,
An Axe Age, A Sword Age,
Where shields are cloven,
A Wind Age, A Wolf Age,
Where the world falls,
No one shall be spared...
--Voluspa"

Fate of the Norns: Ragnarok, second edition (20th Anniversary Edition) (2012-2013)
Fate of the Norns: Ragnarok Second Edition, also known as the Twentieth Anniversary Edition, was the result of a Kickstarter project. It changed the game mechanics once more, while keeping the Ragnarok theme and scenarios. The Runic Game System (RGS) was updated and made use of an additional rune, the 'Void rune', not found in regular Elder Futhark rune sets.  Weapon meta tags are added to give weapons their own style of play (blunt weapons knock down, pierce weapons cause bleeding, etc.). Three distinct Wounds tracks have been added to the playmate allowing groups to customize the legality level of their campaigns.

Fate of the Norns: Fafnir's Treasure
"Fafnir's Treasure" is a beginner's journey into the world of Fate of the Norns, intended to introduce new players to Norse mythology and the unique mechanics of game play in Fate of the Norns. The self-contained adventure is highly recommended by a number of RPG players and has been updated and re-released in late 2012 updated to the rules of the 20th Anniversary Edition.

Distribution
From 1993 until mid-2012, all Fate of the Norns products were sold only as digital products. A hardcover of the original 1993 Fate of the Norns (first edition) was published in mid-2012 and gathered enough interest to motivate further printed products. A successful Kickstarter project for a new edition of the core rules, Fate of the Norns: Ragnarok 20th Anniversary Edition began in August 2012. A printed re-release of the quick-start module "Fafnir's Treasure" followed shortly in late 2012, and the new core rules were first published as a hardcover in April 2013.

Previous Fate of the Norns products until 2012 were sold only by the official website. Now, all current and future editions are distributed via online third party vendors.

Reception
The first edition 290-page book was well-received for its content and game mechanics, but presentation was rated as poor.

Valkauskas and his team of developers debuted the Anniversary Edition of Fate of the Norns: Ragnarok at Gen Con in August 2012, with the beginner-level campaign titled "Fafnir's Treasure". The campaign was designed to introduce RPG players to the unique mechanics and flavor of Fate of the Norns.

This edition has received excellent reviews from a number of publications, including the Rockin' Comics podcast and CarnageCon.com.

Most notably, Sophie Prell of Penny Arcade gave "Fafnir's Treasure" a thorough review that supported the game and the unique rune-based system, saying, "The third edition, Ragnarok ups the stakes by making the game high fantasy during an apocalyptic time period, and everything fits together in a wonderfully cohesive package. The art, text, even the rules feel like something mystical and ancient." A follow-up article by Prell contains the story of the game's development and Valkauskas' journey in developing the systems and stories in the game.

References

External links
Fate of the Norns official site
Official Forums
Andrew Valkauskas' profile at RPGGeek.com

Fantasy role-playing games
Role-playing games introduced in 1993